Newspapers have been widely distributed in the United Kingdom for hundreds of years. Sales rose during the 1800s and continued to do so until the middle of the 20th century, when they reached their peak circulation, however since then their readership has significantly declined. Today, the UK's most highly circulating paper is the free sheet Metro whilst other popular titles include tabloids such as The Sun and Daily Mirror, middle market papers such as the Daily Mail and Daily Express and broadsheet newspapers such as The Guardian and The Times.

History 

At the start of the 19th century, the highest-circulation newspaper in the United Kingdom was the Morning Post, which sold around 4,000 copies per day, twice the sales of its nearest rival. As production methods improved, print runs increased and newspapers were sold at lower prices. By 1828, the Morning Herald was selling the most copies, but it was soon overtaken by The Times.

Pubs would typically take in one or two papers for their customers to read, and through this method, by the 1850s the newspaper of the licensed trade, the Morning Advertiser, had the second highest circulation. Sales of The Times were around 40,000, and it had around 80% of the entire daily newspaper market, but Sunday papers were more popular, some boasting sales of more than 100,000. Later in the century, the Daily News came to prominence, selling 150,000 copies a day in the 1870s, while by 1890, The Daily Telegraph had a circulation of 300,000. Sunday newspaper sales also grew rapidly, with Lloyd's Weekly Newspaper being the first to sell one million copies an issue. The press was changed by the introduction of halfpenny papers. The first national halfpenny paper was the Daily Mail (followed by the Daily Express and the Daily Mirror), which became the first weekday paper to sell one million copies around 1911. Circulation continued to increase, reaching a peak in the mid-1950s; sales of the News of the World reached a peak of more than eight million in 1950. 

Since the 1950s, there has been a gradual decline in newspaper sales. The availability of multimedia news platforms has accelerated this decline in the 21st century, and by the close of 2014, no UK daily or Sunday newspaper had a circulation exceeding two million. The overall circulation of newspapers declined by 6.6% in 2014–15.In February 2018 The Sun'''s 40-year dominance at the top of the circulation charts was eclipsed by the free Metro newspaper for the first time. In May 2020 the Audit Bureau of Circulations, which records and audits sales, stated that monthly publication of circulation figures would no longer be automatic, as publishers were concerned that they had become a "negative narrative of decline". The first newspapers to decline to publish circulation figures were The Telegraph, The Sun and The Times.

Daily newspapers

 2020 to present 
Figures shown are average circulations for January of each year. Regardless of immediate source, all figures originate from the Audit Bureau of Circulations. In the 2020s, several newspapers stopped reporting circulation figures.

2010–2019
Figures shown are average circulations for January of each year. Regardless of immediate source, all figures originate from the Audit Bureau of Circulations.

2000–2009
Figures shown are average circulations for January of each year.  Only newspapers with circulations of more than 100,000 copies per day in January 2009 are listed. Regardless of immediate source, all figures originate from the Audit Bureau of Circulations.

1950–1999
Figures shown are average circulations for each year.  Figures originate from the Audit Bureau of Circulations.

Before 1950
Figures shown are average circulations for each year.  Figures from after 1931 originate from the Audit Bureau of Circulations;those from 1852 and 1838 originate from stamp duty returns.  Those from 1910, 1921 and 1930 are the most uncertain and rely on information originating from T. B. Browne's Advertiser's ABC''.

Sunday newspapers

2020 to present 
Figures shown are average circulations for January of each year.  Only newspapers with circulations of more than 50,000 copies in January 2020 are listed.  Regardless of immediate source, all figures originate from the Audit Bureau of Circulations. In the 2020s, several newspapers stopped reporting circulation figures.

2010–2019 
Figures shown are average circulations for January of each year.  Only newspapers with circulations of more than 100,000 copies in January 2010 are listed.  Regardless of immediate source, all figures originate from the Audit Bureau of Circulations.

2000–2009
Figures shown are average circulations for January of each year.  Only newspapers with circulations of more than 100,000 copies in January 2009 are listed.  Regardless of immediate source, all figures originate from the Audit Bureau of Circulations.

20th century
Figures shown are average circulations for each year.  Figures originate from the Audit Bureau of Circulations.

19th century
Figures shown are average circulations for each year.  Figures originate from stamp duty returns.

Regional newspapers
Figures shown are average circulations for each year.  Figures originate from the Audit Bureau of Circulations.

See also 
List of newspapers in the United Kingdom
List of newspapers in the world by circulation

References

United Kingdom
Circulation